The Cota Round Barns near St. Cloud, Minnesota, United States, are reinforced concrete round barns built in 1921.  The set of barns was listed on the National Register of Historic Places in 1982. According to a survey of Benton County historic resources, the Cota Round Barns are "a notable link" with the agricultural developments of 1880–1900 in the area.

References

Barns on the National Register of Historic Places in Minnesota
Buildings and structures completed in 1921
Buildings and structures in Benton County, Minnesota
Round barns in Minnesota
National Register of Historic Places in Benton County, Minnesota
1921 establishments in Minnesota